Thrust is a 1986 video game programmed by Jeremy Smith (who later co-authored Exile) for the BBC Micro and published by Superior Software. The player's aim is to manoeuvre a spaceship by rotating and thrusting, as it flies over a two-dimensional landscape and through caverns. The gameplay of Thrust was heavily inspired by Atari's Gravitar.

Thrust was ported to the Commodore 64, Amstrad CPC, Atari 8-bit family, Atari ST, Commodore 16/Plus 4, and ZX Spectrum. Firebird released a sequel, Thrust II, in 1988.

Gameplay

The aim is to pilot a spacecraft which must pick up a pod using a tractor beam and fly it into space. The ship and pod are subject to gravity and inertia, and being connected by a stiff rod can end up spinning around each other, out of control. Hitting the walls of the cave with either the ship or the pod results in death.

Each planet has turrets which fire bullets at the ship, which can be destroyed with a single shot, and a reactor which powers the defence system of each planet. If the reactor is shot enough the turrets will cease firing for a short amount of time. Hitting the reactor with many bullets causes it to go critical and destroy the planet in 10 seconds - the ship must escape into space before this happens, with or without the pod (more points are gained if the pod is present).

Fuel is needed to manœuvre the ship and can be collected with the tractor beam, if the ship runs out of fuel the whole game is over. A shield is also available, although when activated it uses fuel and the ship cannot shoot.

Later levels have doors that are opened by shooting a panel. After all 6 levels have been completed the levels start again, but first with gravity reversed, then with the planet and walls invisible unless the shield is used, and finally with invisible walls and reverse gravity. After the 24th level is complete a message is displayed. Two more messages are available after completing the 48th and 72nd level, and from then on the 3rd message is repeated.  On the BBC Micro implementation, the messages displayed are "Support Hotol", "Physics is fun" and "I love space."

Development

Superior Software agreed to publish it as a full price game but they required an Acorn Electron conversion (to release it as a joint BBC/Electron package). While this was being created, it was also ported to other systems beginning with the Commodore 64. All other versions were to be published by Firebird Software at a budget price. The C64 version actually made it to release a couple of months before the BBC/Electron version and became a number one best seller (hence the claim on the BBC/Electron cover).

Legacy
Hobbyist-written clones were released for the Atari 2600 (2000) and Vectrex (2004) consoles using the same name as the original.

Thrust was credited by Bjørn Stabell as an influence on the game XPilot.

References

External links

Thrust for the Atari ST at Atari Mania
Thrust for the Atari 8-bit family at Atari Mania
Thrust from Firebird Software at Byte Cellar

1986 video games
Amstrad CPC games
Atari 8-bit family games
Atari ST games
BBC Micro and Acorn Electron games
Commodore 16 and Plus/4 games
Commodore 64 games
Multidirectional shooters
Space combat simulators
Superior Software games
Telecomsoft games
Video games developed in the United Kingdom
Video games scored by Rob Hubbard
Video games set on fictional planets
ZX Spectrum games
Single-player video games